Frederick Schrecker (10 January 1892 – 13 July 1976) was an Austrian actor, who appeared on stage, screen and film in his home country and the United Kingdom.

Beginning his career on stage, Schrecker went on to feature in German films "Der Feldherrnhügel" (1926) and "Die Koffer des Herrn O.F." (1931) under the names Fritz Schrecker and Franz Schrecker.

As a result of the Nazi regime in Germany, Schrecker, being Jewish, was forced to flee to England. There, in 1939, he was a co-founder of the Viennese Theatre Club of Paddington, a "celebrated émigré cabaret and theatre", also known as Das Laterndl. The theatrical group of talented Austrian exiles, which included the likes of Lona Cross, Martin Miller and Marianne Walla became known for their sketches and plays which represented a "satirical commentary on Vienna under Nazi rule".

During the Second World War, Schrecker participated in BBC anti-Nazi information programmes. After the war ended he stayed in Israel for a while before returning to England in 1947.

There, he anglicised his first name to Frederick and appeared in many TV productions, including four of the six episodes of  The Trollenberg Terror (as Dr. Spielmann), (but not in the feature film of the same, The Trollenberg Terror); Dixon of Dock Green; No Hiding Place; The Four Just Men; Compact; Doctor Who: The Web of Fear; Callan; and The Liver Birds; and films, too, such as Counterspy, in 1953, working up until his death.

Filmography

References

External links 

Frederick Schrecker at Theatricalia

1892 births
1976 deaths
Austrian male television actors
Male actors from Vienna
Austrian emigrants to the United Kingdom
Austrian Jews